Mikkel Kessler (born 1 March 1979) is a Danish former professional boxer who competed from 1998 to 2013. He held multiple super-middleweight world championships, including the WBA title three times between 2004 and 2013, and the WBC title twice between 2006 and 2010.

Early life 
Kessler was born to a Danish father and an English mother, Ann, who hails from Salisbury, Wiltshire. He began his vocation early, training in boxing gyms at age 13.

Amateur career
Kessler competed five years as an amateur (2/93-1/98). He finished his amateur career with a record of 44 wins and three losses. He won the 1995 European Cadet (15-16 age group) Championship, 1996 and 1997 Danish Junior Championships, the 1996 Nordic Amateur Championship, and in his last amateur bout won the 1998 Zealand International Tournament after stopping all 3 of his opponents.

Professional career

Early career 
Kessler originally campaigned as a light middleweight and then middleweight for the first 22 fights of his career. He won all of his first 22 fights by knockout (KO).

Super middleweight 
After 3 years and 22 fights, Kessler settled in the super middleweight division. Kessler continued his hard hitting streak, dispatching 6 of his first 7 opponents by KO, thereby improving his record to 29–0 with 22 KO.

On 29 November 2002, Kessler fought for his first championship and defeated former WBC Super Middleweight Champion Dingaan Thobela over twelve rounds to become the International Boxing Association Champion. He gave up this belt to fight for the more recognized WBC International title on 11 April 2003, versus Craig Cummings. Kessler won by a knockout in the third round.

He defended his title on three occasions before finally hitting it big on 12 November 2004. His stablemate, Mads Larsen, another Danish World Class fighter, was set to challenge Manny Siaca for the WBA Championship in Copenhagen. Larsen was injured in training and Kessler took the fight on short notice, winning the title.

Kessler defended his title against Anthony Mundine in Sydney in June 2005 and Eric Lucas in January 2006.

On 14 October 2006, Kessler was elevated to WBA Super Champion status after winning the WBC title in a unification battle against WBC World Champion Markus Beyer at the Parken Stadium. He won by knockout at 2:58 in round 3.

Kessler defended his WBA (Super) and WBC titles on 24 March 2007, at the Parken Stadium against WBC mandatory challenger Librado Andrade. The fight was scored as a shutout (120–108) by all three judges.

Kessler vs. Calzaghe

Kessler then met fellow undefeated champion, Welshman Joe Calzaghe, in a bout that would unify his WBA and WBC super middleweight championships with Calzaghe's WBO and The Ring titles. The bout took place at Cardiff's Millennium Stadium on 3 November 2007, in front of over 50,000 fans (then the largest indoor boxing event in European history), and Kessler lost the unification bout via unanimous decision, with the judges scoring the fight: 117–111, 116–112, 116–112.

Second world title reign
After Calzaghe vacated the WBA title to move up to light heavyweight, Kessler was put in a match with Dimitri Sartison on 21 June 2008, for the vacant belt. Kessler knocked out Sartison in the final round to regain his title.

Kessler successfully defended his title against Danilo Häussler by third-round knockout on 25 October and against Gusmyl Perdomo (16–2, 10 KOs) by fourth-round knockout on 12 September 2009, one minute into the round.

In November 2009 the WBA once again promoted him to Super Champion, this time prior to unifying any Super Middleweight titles.

Super Six

Kessler vs. Ward

His first fight was against Andre Ward on 21 November 2009 for Kessler's WBA Super Middleweight Championship in the Super Six World Boxing Classic.
On 21 November 2009 Kessler lost his championship to Andre Ward. The fight was stopped in the eleventh round due to cuts on Kessler's face caused by what were deemed as unintentional headbutts by Ward, five in total. Kessler expressed in the post fight interview that he couldn't get out of first gear due to the headbutts and excessive clinching from Ward, and that he was eventually blinded by one of Ward's headbutts which on the post fight replay showed Ward ram his forehead directly into Kessler's eye. The fight went to the scorecards and Ward was far ahead by scores of 98–92, 98–92 and 97–93 at the time of the stoppage.

Kessler vs. Froch

On 24 April 2010 Kessler returned to fight against Britain's undefeated WBC Champion Carl Froch, a match that was called "a classic" and "one of the best matches in Danish boxing ever." The contest went the distance and Kessler was handed a unanimous decision with scores of 115–113, 116–112 and 117–111. With the win, Kessler became a two time WBC Champion, handing Carl Froch his first defeat in the process. Froch later stated that he'd suffered a minor ear injury during training and he felt he would've won the fight if it had been held in his home-country of England, but congratulated Kessler on his victory.

Andre Ward later praised Kessler tremendously in an interview, calling Kessler "skill wise... the toughest I’ve fought so far." Ward went on to express admiration over Kessler's career and dispelling any criticism after his own victory over Kessler. "People want to put down Mikkel Kessler because of our fight but he’s proven himself. He’s proven that if he loses a title he can come back and become champion again, he did that after our fight so now he’s a three time world champion. Anybody that can win a world title three times and only have two losses in the process says a lot. He’s a great fighter and I give him a lot of credit and I have a lot of respect for him."

On 25 August Kessler announced he was withdrawing from the Super Six tournament due to the worsening of the eye injury he suffered in his fight against Ward. According to Ekstra Bladet newspaper, Kessler stated he was seeing double. Doctors told him he must take a nine-month break from boxing.

Comeback

Kessler vs. Bouadla
Mikkel Kessler suddenly announced his comeback, and fought against Mehdi Bouadla and scored victory by TKO. Mikkel claimed that if he had lost this fight he would retire. He was scheduled to fight against Robert Stieglitz in Copenhagen, Denmark at Parken Stadium, but the fight was cancelled due to a hand injury Kessler sustained in training.

Light heavyweight

Kessler vs. Green
In 2012, Kessler moved up in weight class to light heavyweight. In May 2012, he fought Allan Green for the vacant WBC Silver Light Heavyweight title. Kessler won via knockout in the fourth round, after getting dropped by a hard right hand in the first round.

Return to super middleweight

Kessler vs. Magee

Late in 2012, Kessler went up against Brian Magee of Northern Ireland for the WBA Super middleweight title. Two times in the 2nd round Brian Magee went to the floor after hard bodyshots from Kessler, and 24 seconds in the third round it was all over, when Kessler landed another hard bodyshot to Brian Magee.

Kessler vs. Froch II

On 15 January 2013, it was announced that a rematch between Mikkel Kessler and Carl Froch was going to take place on 25 May 2013 at The O2 Arena in London. There will be two belts on the line, Kessler's WBA- and Froch's IBF title. Kessler won the last showdown between the two boxers, in Herning, Denmark. That time Froch was an undefeated WBC title holder, and they were both fighting in the Super Six World Boxing Classic. The faced each other at stage 2, after Kessler lost his first fight against Andre Ward, and Froch won a close fought contest against Andre Dirrell.

Froch defeated Kessler by unanimous decision on 25 May 2013, by 118-110 116-112 115-113 as he controlled Kessler with his jab for large parts of the fight. Kessler caught Froch with a big right hand in the 11th round to wobble him, but it was too late in the fight.

Retirement and potential comeback
On 1 February 2015, Kessler announced that he was in a "state of retirement" via social media. Kessler came out of retirement on 31 March 2017. On 21 June, it was said that Kessler could be added to the World Boxing Super Series. Kessler passed on the Super Series and was looking to face Roamer Angulo on November. On 16 October, Kessler revealed he had been hit by Lyme disease and his return would be delayed until 2018. In February 2018, speaking to BT, Kessler said, "I just can't find the motivation to go through with it all," confirming he would stay retired.

Cultural significance 
Mikkel Kessler is mentioned by name in the Danish band Volbeat's song "A Warrior's Call" with the lyric "The Viking warrior Mikkel Kessler will now brand his name in the back of your head, yeah..."

Professional boxing record

References

External links
 

Mikkel Kessler Fight-by-Fight Career Record

World super-middleweight boxing champions
World Boxing Association champions
World Boxing Council champions
Sportspeople from Copenhagen
1979 births
Living people
Danish male boxers
Light-heavyweight boxers
Danish people of English descent